Silvia Hector Webber (1807 – ca. 1892) and John Fernando Webber (ca. 1786–1795 – 1882) were a mixed-race couple who were among the initial settlers in Austin's Colony in Travis County, Texas. John, previously a private and a medic during the War of 1812, was the first non-native resident and the founder of Webber's Prairie, where he had established a fort. The town was later named Webberville, Texas. The Webbers secured the freedom of Sylvia and their children ultimately by giving up much of their Webberville property. The family was subject to cruel racial prejudice and their children were unable to attend school with white children. The Webbers hired a live-in private tutor.

When the Republic of Texas was founded in 1836, the Webber's marriage was deemed illegal and black people lost many of their rights that they enjoyed under the former Mexican Texas. They were subject to increasingly dangerous persecution and were afraid of Silvia and the children being captured and enslaved by slave hunters, also called Blackbirders.

They moved to Hidalgo County, Texas by the mid 1850s and settled along the Rio Grande. They are believed to have been conductors on the southern route of the Underground Railroad to Mexico. John smuggled tobacco into Northern Mexico, and during those runs, he also helped former enslaved people attain their freedom. Silvia was particularly known for taking-in people in need. John also ran a business ferrying people and goods across the Rio Grande. During the Civil War, the family sided with the United States Army and two of their sons were captured by the Confederate States Army.

John Ferdinand Webber
John Ferdinand Webber was a white man born in Danville, Vermont between 1786 and 1795. (He was said to have been born January 24, 1786, around 1786, in 1794, or around 1795.) His parents, Hannah Morrill and John Webber, emigrated from Europe to America. 

He served from May 23, 1813 to May 31, 1814 as a private and a medic in the War of 1812. He served in the Thirty-first United States Infantry under Captain S. Dickinson and he fought in the battle of Shadage Woods. John arrived in Mexico, San Felipe de Austin, in 1823 seeking to settle. He lived in central Texas for 30 years until 1853, when he moved to Hidalgo County.

Silvia Hector
Silvia Hector was born into slavery in Spanish West Florida (present day east Louisiana) in 1807. She had been owned by Silas McDaniel of Clark County, Missouri. When she was twelve years old, she was sold to McDaniel's father-in-law, Morgan Cryer, Sr. of Clark County, Arkansas for $550 on March 10, 1819.

Silvia likely came to Texas when she was 19 years old in 1826 with John Cryer, who was one of three adult children of Morgan Cryer, Sr. who settled in Mexican Texas. The other two were Kezia Cryer Taylor and Rebecca Cryer Cummins. On March 15, 1826, there were five enslaved people with John Cryer in Austin's register of families. Cryer petitioned for a Mexican land grant as part of Austin's Colony.

Marriage and children
John was among the original settlers of medic in the War of 1812 in Mexican-owned Texas (1821–1836). The colony was established by Stephen F. Austin and Webber lived there beginning in 1826. John was a neighbor and business partner of John Cryer, According to Noah Smithwick (a man who worked and knew both men), Cryer and John were in the business of smuggling tobacco in Northern Mexico. He met Silvia at some point between 1826 and 1829 and "became infatuated with her." Their first child, Alcy, was born in October 1829. Sons Henry and John Webber were born by 1834.

John Webber was married to Silvia Hector before 1832 by Father Michael Muldoon. By 1834, while still enslaved, Silvia had given birth to three children with John Webber. As most enslaved women, Silvia experienced a complex relationship with John, a white landowner, and yet, together, Silvia and John negotiated the securing of their three children's freedoms and the freedom of Silvia herself by June 11, 1834. 

Silvia's freedom papers, reveal that her enslaver, John Cryer, attempted to negotiate under very strict and violent terms. In the papers, John Cryer did not request payment in specie or land, but requested to receive payment in human beings. He specifically required the Webbers to pay him two young enslaved children, a boy age 2 and a girl age 3. Records found by Dr. Maria Hammack demonstrate that the Webbers did not heed Cryer's request. On the contrary the Webbers refused to make that payment and by 1850, the Webbers chose to forfeit a large portion of their Webberville property in order to settle the debt that they owed to Cryer for Silvia and her children's freedoms.

The Webbers had a total of 13 children, eleven when not counting those who died in infancy. They hired Robert G. McAdoo, a North Carolinian school teacher, to be a live-in tutor for their children,  because the Webber children were not allowed to attend the local school due to racial prejudice.

Pioneer farmer

Webber's Prairie
John owned 2,214 acres of land that became known as Webber's Prairie. He received the land as a headright on June 22, 1832. It is located near the border of Bastrop and Travis Counties and on the Colorado River. Around 1832, John built Webber's Fort and stockade on the top of a hill. He was the first non-native resident on Webber's Prairie in Travis County, Texas, which was named Webberville after him. The town  is on the outskirts of present-day Austin.

Beginning in the 1820s, John traveled to Mexico to sell tobacco. He worked with several partners—John Cryer, Clay Coppedge, and Noah Smithwick—who traveled together to San Fernando, Mexico. He titled himself as Dr. John F. Webber as a front for their key purpose: to surreptitiously sell packets of tobacco.

Interracial couple
Silvia was the first free black woman to settle in Webberville and one of the first free black persons to settle in Travis County. Initially, they were accepted as an interracial couple, although Silvia was never seen as "an equal" their neighbors at Webberville treated her with respect because they appreciated her kindness. Silvia acquired the nickname Puss and early settlers considered her kind, welcoming and intelligent. Women appreciated her charitable offer of assistance, whatever it may be. She is remembered for taking in and comforting an orphaned child, as well as opening her home to a man disabled with rheumatoid arthritis for years. When white women visited her house, she served them while they ate, but she and her children did not eat with them. When women offered to return the favor, she ate alone in their kitchen.

In 1836, the Republic of Texas was established following the Texas Revolution. Its constitution took away the rights and freedoms that black people had under Mexican law and outlawed interracial marriage. As more people from the Deep South moved into the area in the 1840s, Silvia and their children experienced "cruel prejudice and discriminatory treatment". The new Webberville settlers wanted to "rid the settlement of its founder and his family of mulato offspring". By the early 1850s the Webbers's lives at Webberville had been threatened and they chose to uproot and move to Mexico.

The Webbers were also afraid that Blackbirders, or slave stealers and slave catchers, would kidnap his family members and sell them into slavery.

Along the Rio Grande
In 1853, John, Silvia and their children left Webberville and moved to Hildalgo County. Upon their arrival they were accepted among Mexican American families and relocated to what is now southern Texas near the border of Texas and Mexico near the Rio Grande. They had a 8,856-acre ranch, six miles east of Hidalgo, in what was the Porción Agostadero del Gato land grant. They also established a homestead south of the town of Donna on the banks of the Rio Grande, across the river from Reynosa, Mexico. They established and ran a ferry from their land on Webber's Ranch and across the river to transport goods for their trading business. His cousins—Peter, John, and Andrew Webber—went on trading journeys with him. To assimilate better while trading in Mexico, he changed his name to Juan Fernando Webber. He also bought property from the La Blanca land grant.

Underground Railroad
Silvia and John were anti-slavery advocates and Unionists. They offered a safe haven to freedom seekers bound for Mexico. Silvia was known to be charitable to anyone that needed assistance. She and her family fed and provided shelter and asylum to runaway slaves on the Underground Railroad that led to Mexico.  They used their ferry to deliver freedom seekers across the Rio Grande. Their neighbors, Matilda and Nathaniel Jackson also helped people escaping slavery.

Civil War
Unlike most of their neighbors, the Webbers were sympathetic to the Union Army during the Civil War. The Confederate States Army occupied the Rio Grande Valley and they were persecuted for their position against the Confederacy and were driven off their land. 

According to Colonel John Salmon Ford, the Webbers "closed the doors [on his soldiers] and refused admission until [Colonel] Ford came". Confederate troops captured two of John's sons. One of the Webber men escaped and went to Fort Brown to notify the Union Army soldiers that Ford had 60 soldiers. The family fled to Mexico and did not return until May 1865 at the end of the war or in 1882 before John's death.

Later years and death
In 1872, John received a pension from the United States. He died on July 19, 1882 in his home. He was buried in the Webber Cemetery in Hidalgo County, near Donna, Texas. Silvia died around 1891 or 1892.

Legacy
 The Webbers helped establish Webberville in Bastrop County and Donna in Hidalgo County, Texas.
 A memorial for John Ferdinand Webber is located at the Webber's family cemetery off of US 281, near the Donna Pumping Station, in Hidalgo County.

Notes

References

Bibliography
 

1807 births
Year of birth unknown
1882 deaths
1892 deaths
Underground Railroad people
People from Danville, Vermont
People from Travis County, Texas
People from Hidalgo County, Texas